The Modern Art of Setting Ablaze is the third studio album by German sludge metal band Mantar, which was released by Nuclear Blast on 24 August 2018. The album also was released in Russia, Japan and South Africa.

Reception

In a review for Metal Wani, Prateek Kulkarni called it "Mantar's best album yet" and added that The Modern Art of Setting Ablaze blows Ode [to the Flame] out of the water for me. It is heavier, filthier and the vocals sound wretched – [that's] how I like my sludge". Kulkarni also stated that "there isn't a bad track on this album, but if I have to mention some personal standout tracks, [it will be] "Age of the Absurd", "Eternal Return", "Obey the Obscene" and "The Formation of Night".

Track listing

Personnel
Hanno Klänhardt – lead vocals/lead guitar
Erinç Sakarya – drums

Charts

References

2018 albums
Nuclear Blast albums